The 2009–10 Purdue Boilermakers women's basketball team will represent Purdue University in the 2009–10 NCAA Division I women's basketball season. The Boilermakers will be coached by Sharon Versyp. The Boilermakers are a member of the Big Ten Conference and will attempt to win the NCAA championship.

Offseason
May 5:Drey Mingo, a sophomore forward at Maryland will transfer to Purdue. Mingo appeared in 33 of 35 games this past season for the 31-5 Terrapins, including all 14 regular-season Atlantic Coast Conference contests. She averaged 3.7 points and 2.1 rebounds.

May 5:The Atlantic Coast Conference and the Big Ten Conference announced the pairings for the annual Big Ten/ACC Challenge for women's basketball. The Boilermakers will travel to Charlottesville, Va., to take on Virginia on Thursday, Dec. 3. It is the first meeting in women's basketball between the two schools. The Cavaliers finished the 2008–09 season with a 24–10 record and were knocked out in the second round of the NCAA Tournament, 99-73 by California.
 Sept. 9: Sharon Versyp has been named the honorary chair for the 2009 Greater Lafayette Hunger Hike. The Hunger Hike is a community service project for the Purdue women's basketball team.

Exhibition

Regular season
The Boilermakers will participate in the BTI Classic, to be held November 20–22 in West Lafayette.

Roster

Schedule

Player stats

Postseason

Big Ten tournament

NCAA basketball tournament

Awards and honors

Team players drafted into the WNBA

References

External links
Official website

Purdue
Purdue Boilermakers women's basketball seasons